The 2017–18 Pepperdine Waves men's basketball team represented Pepperdine University during the 2017–18 NCAA Division I men's basketball season. The Waves were led by seventh-year head coach Marty Wilson and played their home games at the Firestone Fieldhouse in Malibu, California as members of the West Coast Conference. They finished the season 6–26, 2–16 in WCC play to finish in last place. They defeated Santa Clara in the first round of the WCC tournament before losing in the quarterfinals to Saint Mary's.

On February 13, 2018, the school announced that head coach Marty Wilson would not return as head coach following the end of the season. He finished at Pepperdine with a seven-year record of 88–129 (91–139 when including his 3–10 record as interim head coach in 1995–96). On March 12, the school hired Lorenzo Romar as head coach. Romar returned to Pepperdine where he started his coaching career in 1996.

Previous season
The Waves finished the 2016–17 season 9–22, 5–13 in WCC play to finish in eighth place. They lost in the first round of the WCC tournament to Pacific.

Offseason

Departures

Incoming transfers

Recruiting class of 2017

Roster

Schedule and results

|-
!colspan=8 style=| Non conference regular season

|-
!colspan=8 style=| WCC regular season

|-
!colspan=8 style=| WCC tournament

References

Pepperdine Waves men's basketball seasons
Pepperdine
Pepperdine
Pepperdine